Fall Brook also known as Toad Hollow Brook is a river in Delaware County, New York. It flows into Bear Kill southeast of Grand Gorge. It drains the northeastern side of Schultice Mountain and flows northeast through Toad Hollow.

References

Rivers of New York (state)
Rivers of Delaware County, New York